Manchester Local School District is a school district in southern Summit County, Ohio that serves a large portion of the city of New Franklin.

Board of education
Current members of the board of education include:
Richard Sponseller (President)
Cindy McDonald (Vice President)
Joe Hercules
Jason Jividen
Mark Tallman

Schools
There are three schools in the district:
Manchester High School
Principal Scott Ross
Associate Principal Derek MaugerManchester Middle SchoolPrincipal James MillerGilbert T. Nolley Elementary School'''
Principal Christi Pappas

References

School districts in Summit County, Ohio